The 2018 CECAFA Women's Championship was the third edition of the association football tournament for women's national teams in the East African region. It was held in Kigali, Rwanda between 19 and 27 July 2018.

The defending champions Tanzania won the competition for the second time after defeating Ethiopia 4–1 in their final match on 27 July 2018.

Participants
Source:

Venue 
The matches were played at one venue in the city of Kigali.

Draw
The tournament was played on a league basis with the team topping the table being declared the winner.

Group stage

Final standings

Statistics

Goalscorers 
Top goal scorers;

3 goals

  Meselu Abera Tesfamariam
  Donisia Daniel Minja

2 goals

  Lillian Mutuuzo

1 goal

 Birtukan Gebrekirstos
 Mirikat Feleke
 Senaf Wakuma Demise
 Dorcas Shikobe
 Mercy Achieng
 Terry Engesha
 Alice Kalimba
 Asha Saada Rashid
 Asha Shabani Hamza
 Mwanahamisi Shurua
 Stumai Abdallah Athumani
 Fatuma Khatibu Salum
 Grace Aluka
 Yudaya Nakayenze
 Norah Alupo
 Shadia Nankya

Awards 
The following awards were given at the conclusion of the tournament.

References

2016 in women's association football
CECAFA Women's Championship
CECAFE
2016 in African football
International association football competitions hosted by Uganda